Mininder S. Kocher is an American orthopedic surgeon.

Early life and education
Kocher was born in Rochester, New York to parents who were immigrants from India. His mother was an elementary school teacher while his father was a professor of thermodynamics.
Kocher graduated with his medical degree from Duke University.

Career
Kocher was first author on the 1999 publication "Differentiating Between Septic Arthritis and Transient Synovitis of the Hip in Children: An Evidence-Based Clinical Prediction Algorithm", where he introduced the Kocher criteria that are used to diagnose septic arthritis. As of 2017, he was the Associate Director of the Sports Medicine Division at Boston Children's Hospital.

References

American orthopedic surgeons
American people of Indian descent in health professions
Duke University School of Medicine alumni
Harvard Medical School people